Gary Devore may refer to:
Gary DeVore (1941–1997), Hollywood screenwriter
Gary Devore (archaeologist) (born 1970), American archaeologist and author (also as Gary M Devore)

See also
Devore (disambiguation)